N.W.A. and the Posse is a compilation album, re-releasing N.W.A and associated groups' underground rap songs from the Los Angeles area's rap scene on November 6, 1987. It is regarded as American rap group N.W.A's first but neglected album; N.W.A's authorized debut studio album, rather, is Straight Outta Compton, released in August 1988. Whereas the Straight album was certified platinum, one million copies sold, in July 1989, the Posse album was certified gold, half as many copies sold, in April 1994.

Originally not N.W.A's intended album release, the Posse album was released by Macola Records—which was then the Los Angeles hip hop scene's main distributor—by collecting songs, mainly N.W.A's EP titled N.W.A, that Macola had distributed for N.W.A's record label, Ruthless Records. Macola omitted the N.W.A EP's track "A Bitch iz a Bitch" to favor party, electro sounds, like the "Panic Zone" track, that led the Los Angeles rap scene until N.W.A's Straight album hit. Months after Straight Outta Compton was released the new Ruthless distributor, Priority Records, re-issued the Posse album with the "Bitch" track included.

Backstory
Six of the 11 tracks on the Posse album are from then-N.W.A members: Eazy-E, Dr. Dre, Ice Cube, Arabian Prince, and DJ Yella. MC Ren was not yet in N.W.A, and does not appear on the record though is on the cover photograph. One track is of Microphone Mike, later called Myka 9, along with Rappinstine, a traveling faction of the DJ crew World Class Wreckin' Cru, whose core had yielded N.W.A's Dr. Dre and DJ Yella.

Four of the Posse album's tracks are from the Fila Fresh Crew, a rap crew including Doc-T, who soon renamed himself The D.O.C. Dr. Dre discovered them in Texas, where a DJ friend of his, Dr. Rock, had invited him to perform at a nightclub, where the Fila Fresh Crew was performing. These four tracks had previously been released by Ruthless Records.

Macola 
The World Class Wreckin' Cru', including Dr. Dre and DJ Yella, led by Grandmaster Lonzo, were signed to Lonzo's label Kru-Cut Records, a sublabel of Macola Records, the area's leading distributor of rap records. The success of N.W.A's first three releases—"Boyz-n-the-Hood", "Dope Man", and "8 Ball"—prompted Eazy's call for an EP, distributed by Macola. The EP's five songs included Dre and Cube on "A Bitch iz a Bitch", Eazy on "Fat Girl", and Arabian's production "Panic Zone."

Cover photo 
For the EP's cover photo, Eazy ''summoned'' N.W.A's members to pose for the camera in a Hollywood alleyway near Macola's office. Reportedly, some who were photographed wound up there by merely driving or accompanying another. And future N.W.A rapper MC Ren, living near Eazy, although photographed, was not yet in N.W.A. On the other hand, DJ Yella, although already active within N.W.A, is absent.

Track list
All songs produced by Dr. Dre

Certifications

Notes

N.W.A albums
Albums produced by Dr. Dre
1987 compilation albums
Ruthless Records compilation albums
Gangsta rap compilation albums